Sunil Soren is an Indian politician and member of the Bharatiya Janata Party. Soren was a member of the Jharkhand Legislative Assembly from the Jama constituency in Dumka district. He is currently the Member of Parliament in Lok Sabha from Dumka.

References 

Bharatiya Janata Party politicians from Jharkhand
Members of the Jharkhand Legislative Assembly
Living people
Year of birth missing (living people)
India MPs 2019–present